The English Triple Crown Winners is a three-race competition for Thoroughbred racehorses.

The English Triple Crown consists of the 2000 Guineas Stakes (at 1 mile), The Derby (at 1½ miles), and the St Leger Stakes (at 1 mile 6 furlongs and 127 yds) although the distances have varied throughout the years.

Runners who have won all three races in one year are in bold.

Winners

Notes
 In 1789, Zanga finished first in the St. Leger Stakes, but was disqualified for jostling.
 In 1844, Running Rein finished first in the Epsom Derby, but was disqualified as he was actually an ineligible four-year-old horse named Maccabeus.
 In 1913, Craganour finished first in the Epsom Derby, but was controversially disqualified.
 In 1980, Nureyev finished first in the 2000 Guineas, but was relegated to last place following a stewards' inquiry.

Bibliography
 The History of the thoroughbred, 1978.

Horse racing in Great Britain